Formaldehyde is an organic compound with the formula CH2O.

Formaldehyde may also refer to:

 Formaldehyde (album), an album by the rock band Terrorvision
 "Formaldehyde" (song), a 2013 single by the band Editors
 Formaldehyde resin (disambiguation)

See also
 Formaldehyde releaser